Sheikh ul Bandi is one of the 51 union councils (sub-divisions) of Abbottabad District in Khyber-Pakhtunkhwa province of Pakistan. It is located at 34° 8' 60N, 73° 13' 60E, in the valley toward the north-west of the Sarban Hills. It is considered as one of the oldest village of Abbottabad.

Languages 

The main language is Hindko, Pashto, although Urdu is also spoken and understood.

Ethnic groups 
The predominant ethnic groups of Sheikh ul Bandi are the Jadoons and Syeds. However, there are other minority ethnic groups such as the Sardars , Awans, Mughals, and Abbasis (dhund) who live there as well.

References

Union councils of Abbottabad District

fr:Sheikh-ul-Bandi